Hannah Jade Cain (born 11 February 1999) is a professional footballer who plays as a forward for Leicester City in the FA Women's Super League. She has represented both England on the under-17, under-19 and under-21 national teams, and represented Wales at under-16, under-17 level and senior level.

Club career

Sheffield FC
Cain began her development at the Sheffield United Centre of Excellence. In 2016, Cain joined Sheffield FC in the WSL 2. In October 2016, Cain won the Future Star award at the Sheffield Olympic Legacy Celebration of Sport awards. Cain left Sheffield after they were relegated to the National League for failing to meet the new Championship licensing criteria. In her final season with the club she was named Supporters' Player of the Year.

Everton
In July 2018, Cain signed with Everton on her first full-time professional contract. She made her debut for the Blues against Manchester City as a substitute. Cain scored her first goal for the Blues against Reading in November 2018. On 27 May 2020, Cain left Everton after her contract expired.

International
In April 2014, Cain was named in Wales squad for an under-16 UEFA development tournament in Northern Ireland. Later that year she played for Wales in an under-17 friendly against Northern Ireland. Cain has since represented England on the under-17 and under-19 national teams. In 2017, Cain was called into the under-19 squad, but would not make an appearance until 2018 to compete in the UEFA Women's U-19 Championship qualifiers scoring twice in three starts.

Personal life
Cain attended Hill House School, Doncaster.

Career statistics

Club
.

References

External links
 
 

1999 births
Living people
English women's footballers
Women's Super League players
Everton F.C. (women) players
Sheffield F.C. Ladies players
Sheffield United W.F.C. players
FA Women's National League players
Women's association football midfielders
Footballers from Doncaster
England women's under-21 international footballers
Leicester City W.F.C. players
Wales women's international footballers
Welsh women's footballers